The 2010 Montreal Impact season is the 17th season of the franchise and the team played in the USSF Division 2 Pro League.

Conference table

Players

Multiple nationalities
  Hicham Aâboubou
  Eduardo Sebrango
  Andrei Bădescu
  Srdjan Djekanović

List of 2010 transfers

In

Out

Players out on loan

International caps
Players called for international duty during the 2010 season while under contract with the Montreal Impact.

Awards

Team awards

League awards

Matches

Preseason

USSF Division II regular season

USSF Division II Playoffs

Quarterfinals

Semifinals

Canadian Championship

Regular Season Exhibition Games

2010 season stats

Season stats

Regular season stats

Points leaders

Disciplinary records

1Player is no longer with team

Playoff stats

Points leaders

Disciplinary records

1Player is no longer with team

Notes and references

CF Montréal seasons
Montreal Impact
USSF Division 2 Professional League
Montreal Impact